Bay View Hospital was a hospital located on 23200 Lake Rd in Bay Village, Ohio. The site was originally home to the Washington Lawrence mansion in the late 1800s until 1948 when it was sold to Dr. Richard Sheppard. It served as an osteopathic medical center from 1948 until it closed its doors on March 1, 1981. It was added to the National Register of Historic Places on August 27, 1974.
The former Washington Lawrence mansion (Bay View Hospital) is now part of Cashelmara Luxury Condos. Beginning in the early 1980s, construction began on condos as well as remodeling of the mansion to use as condos.

The Osteopathic Hospital was opened in 1948 by the Sheppard family; the hospital made headlines in  1954 when Dr. Sam Sheppard was accused of killing his pregnant wife.

References

National Register of Historic Places in Cuyahoga County, Ohio
Shingle Style architecture in Ohio
Romanesque Revival architecture in Ohio
Hospital buildings completed in 1874
Bay Village, Ohio
Hospitals in Ohio
Buildings and structures in Cuyahoga County, Ohio
U.S. Route 6
Hospital buildings on the National Register of Historic Places in Ohio